Club Deportivo Atlético Marte, also known as Atlético Marte, is a Salvadorian association football club based in San Salvador.

The club plays in the Primera División de Fútbol Profesional, the top tier of the El Salvador football league system, and host matches at the Estadio Cuscatlán.

Atlético Marte have a long-standing rivalry with their neighbouring club Alianza, with whom they have contested the derby since 1968.

Since its formation in 1950, the club has won eight Primera División titles—in 1955, 1956, 1957, 1969, 1970, 1980–81, 1982, and 1985—and the Segunda División de El Salvador once, in Torneo Clausura 2009).

In 1981, the team was runner-up of the CONCACAF Champions' Cup losing to SV Transvaal of Suriname. Atlético Marte won their inaugural international title, the 1991 CONCACAF Cup Winners Cup with 2 victories over Racing Gonaïves and Leones Negros UdeG and a loss to Comunicaciones F.C.

The club has changed their name several times to C.D. Árabe Marte (1998–99), (1999–00) and C.D. Atlético Marte Quezaltepeque (2006–08). The club returned to the original name in 2008; C.D. Atlético Marte.

In the 1980s, Salvadoran football legend Luis Ramírez Zapata and Norberto Huezo, Ramón Fagoaga, José Luis Rugamas were among their star players.

History

Foundation and early history
The history of Atletico Marte started at the end of the 1940s, when the San Salvadorian team España FC was dissolved.

Emilio Guardado and Carlos Carranza, leaders of the recent dissolved España FC, called a meeting with the players that remained of this team and others in the capital city of San Salvador to give life to another club called Alacranes F.C.

After a year playing under the name of Alacranes F.C., club president Colonel José Castro Melendez called a meeting at the old national gymnasium, and at the initiative of the player Conrado Miranda, it was decided to change the club name to Atletico Marte.

The club was officially born on the 2 June 1950 by the combination of military-related members such as José Castro Melendez, Fidel Quintanilla and Jesús Rodríguez and the general public such as Emilio Guardado, José Santiago Avelar and Armando Carranza.

The original uniform colors were ochre and beige, however with the passage of time the colors were changed to the current blue and white.

One of the most significant events of Atetico Marte was a 2–0 triumph on the home turf of Deportivo Saprissa, the first time a Salvadorian club had defeated a Costa Rican side on the opponent's home turf. The goals were scored by Gustavo "el Bordador" Lucha y Raúl Peña.

Premierships success
The club had played in the Primera División for five years, however it wasn't until the 1955 season under the players-coaches of Conrado Miranda and Isaiah Choto they won their first title. This was done thanks to 1–0 victory over Leones de Sonsonate with the lone goal coming from Fernando "El Gato" Barrios.

The players included Manuel "Tamalón" Garay, Antonio Montes, Armando Larín, Rutilio Rivera, Luis Antonio Regalado "Loco", Conrado Miranda, Gerónimo Pericullo (Argentina), Juan Bautista Pérez (Argentina), Raúl "Pibe" Vásquez (Argentina), Gustavo "el Bordador" Lucha, Fernando "el Gato" Barrios and René Pimentel.

Atletico Marte with the same core group of players from the previous campaign and the inclusion of Guatemalan Gabriel Urriolawere able to capture their second title consecutively, always under the command of Conrado Miranda and Isaiah Choto.

In 1956–57 campaign, the club was rejuvenated with players such as goalkeeper Francisco "Paco" Francés, Argentinian Rodolfo Baello, Guillermo "Loro" Castro, Julio César "Muñeca" Mejía, Mauricio "Pachín" González and many others. The club was able to win their 3rd title.

A winning title would escape the club for more than a decade until 1969 when they won their fourth title thanks to future world cup coach Chilean Hernán Carrasco Vivanco and star players Raúl "Araña" Magaña, Guillermo Castro, Argentinian Rodolfo Baello, José Antonio "Ruso" Quintanilla, Chilean Ricardo Sepúlveda and Sergio Méndez.
This was followed up with their fifth title in 1970 making the second time the club had won back to back title, this time they were reinforced with players such as Francisco Roque, Ernesto Aparicio, Manuel Cañadas, Adonay Castillo, Fernando Villalta, Roberto Morales, Elenilson Franco and Brazilian Odir Jacques.

Atletico Marte once again went a decade without a title, until 1980, when under the technical direction of Armando Contreras Palma and a squad predominately made up of Salvadoran players such as Carlos Felipe Cañadas, Milton Campos, Alfredo Rivera, José Castillo, Jorge Peña, Manuel Ramos, Danilo Blanco, Ramón Fagoaga, Norberto Huezo, Jorge Salomón Campos and Miguel González were able to win their sixth title.

Atletico Marte under the technical direction of Armando Contreras Palma and assistant coach former world cup player Juan Ramón "Mon" Martinez the club was able to win their seventh title i 1982. The tournament was called President Alvaro Alfredo Magaña Cup, in honor of the current president of the republic El Salvador.
This was thanks to a two-game series win over Independiente of San Vicente, the first game was 1–0 victory with a lone goal José Antonio "Tolín" Infantozzi and this was followed with a 2–0 victory with goals by José Antonio "Tolín" Infantozzi and Wilfredo "El Doctorcito" Huezo.

On 25 December 1985, Atlético Marte won their eighth and final Primera División title. This was thanks to a 5–2 victory over Alianza with the goals of Atletico Marte coming from Salomón Campos Mezquita, Norberto Huezo, Mario Figueroa (2) and Wilfredo Huezo.
The list of players that helped them win the title included José Luis Rugamas, Alfredo Fagoaga, Marcial Turcios, Santana Cartagena, Danilo Blanco, Guillermo Ragazzone, Nelson Escobar, Norberto Huezo, Salomón Campos, Mauricio Perla, Carlos Meléndez, William "el Pony" Rosales, Uruguayan Raúl Esnal and Mario Figueroa.

Champions of CONCACAF 1992
On the international stage Atlético Marte had reached the final of the 1981 CONCACAF Champions Cup, however they lost the series to the SV Transvaal from Suriname.
However, in 1991, the club was finally recognized internationally thanks to being crowned the champions of the CONCACAF Cup Winners Cup, a competition which was held in Guatemala and had strong clubs such as Universidad de Guadalajara from Mexico, Comunicaciones from Guatemala, Deportivo Saprissa from Costa Rica and Real Estelí from Nicaragua. Atletico Marte finished first in the group with a record of 2 wins and 1 loss.

Relegation to Segundo División
After several attempts to win another domestic title, by assembling top quality national and foreign players, Atletico Marte suffered a massive decline due to administrative mismanagement and eventually entered into economic crisis which led to poor results eventually getting the club relegated at the end of the 2002 season.

Promotion-back to the Primera División
However, leaders of Atletico Marte never gave up on the team and there was always a well publicized effort to return it to the Primera División. It was not until 2004, that the mythical Raul Alfredo "spider" Magaña approached the directors, presenting a draft where it recruited new sponsors and new management.

After almost five years of work, they won the Clausura 2008 title and would contest the winner of the Apertura to determine direct promotion. The loser would contest the ninth place side in the Primera División to determine if there should be promotion/relegation.

Atletico Marte was unsuccessful at apertura and clausura when they lost to Marte Soyapango in a penalty shootout in the semi-final.

On 14 June 2009 Atletico Marte returned to the Primera División by defeating AFI El Roble 1–0, at the Estadio Cuscatlan.

The only goal of this historic victory was by Roberto Maradiaga, and the technician that made possible the rise was the Argentine Ramiro Cepeda, a former player in Martian Segundo División in his first year working as a coach.

Modern era
Atletico Marte's run in the Primera División from 2009 to 2015 was a mix of little to moderate success, excluding the Apertura 2013 season where under the guidance of Guillermo Rivera the team finished first in the league (including a record 14 undefeated matches) and reached the semi-final where they were eliminated by the tournament champion Isidro Metapan 3–2 on aggregate, the team was a middle to low league team.

Although the emergence of talented players such as Gilberto Baires, Ibsen Castro, Otoniel Salinas, Javier Gomez, Anibal Parada, Christopher Ramirez, Christian Esnal, Argentinian Gonzalo Mazzia and Uruguayan Mauro Aldave.

On 3 May 2015, after 7 years of top flight football, Atletico Marte were relegated to the Segundo División despite a 4–1 victory over Dragon. They were knocked out by C.D. Pasaquina by one point. On 18 June 2015 the team purchased a franchise license in the new expansion of the Primera División and would compete in the Primera División for the Apertura 2015 season.
At the end of 2016 clausura season, Atletico Marte were relegated

In April 2020, El Vencedor announced that due to financial hardship they would be releasing their spot in the Primera División to Atletico Marte.

Honours

Domestic

Leagues
Primera División and predecessors 
 Champions (8): 1955, 1956, 1957, 1969, 1970, 1980–81, 1982, 1985
Segunda División and predecessors
 Champions (1): 2008 Apertura
 Promotion Play-off Winners: 2008–2009

Cups
 Copa President and predecessors 
 Champions (1) : 1991

CONCACAF
CONCACAF Champions' Cup and predecessors 
 Runners-up (1): 1981
CONCACAF Cup Winners Cup and predecessors 
 Champions (1): 1991

UNCAF
UNCAF Champions' Cup/Recopa de la UNCAF and predecessors 
 Champions (1): 1991 Recopa de la UNCAF

Performance in CONCACAF and Domestic competitions

CONCACAF Cup Winners Cup: 2 appearances
Best: Champion in 1991
1991 – Champion
1994 – Quarter-finals

CONCACAF Champions' Cup: 1 appearance
Best: Runner-up in 1981
 1981 CONCACAF Champions' Cup: Runners up

<div style="text-align:left">

Copa Interclubes UNCAF: 5 appearances
Best: Third place in 1979
1971 Copa Fraternidad: Fourth place
1972 Copa Fraternidad: Group stage
1979 Copa Fraternidad: Third place
1980 Copa Fraternidad: Group Stage
1983 Copa Fraternidad: Group Stage

Overall seasons table in Primera División de Fútbol Profesional
{|class="wikitable"
|-bgcolor="#efefef"
! Pos.
! Club
! Season In D1
! Pl.
! W
! D
! L
! GS
! GA
! Dif.
|-
|align=center bgcolor=|TBA
|Atlético Marte
|align=center |65
|align=center|1945
|align=center|715
|align=center|600
|align=center|630
|align=center|2872
|align=center|2522
|align=center|+350
|}

Last updated: 17 July 2015

Stadium

Since its establishment in 1950, Atletico Marte stadiums has been:

Estadio Cuscatlán; San Salvador (2017–present)
 TBD (TBD) game in Segunda DivisiÓn
 Cancha Alfombrada Lirios de Quezaltepeque; Quezaltepeque (2005–2008) games in the 
 Cancha del Estadio Azteca; Ilopaneco (2016) games in the Segunda Division
 Estadio San Vicente, San Vicente (2023-Present)
Estadio Cuscatlán; San Salvador (2001–2005, 2009–2016)
Flor Blanca; San Salvador (1950–2001)

The team plays its home games in the 45,000 capacity all-seater Estadio Cuscatlán, in San Salvador. Previously the team played at Flor Blanca, where they had played their home matches from 1950 until the end of the 2001 season. The stadium in San Salvador. The team's headquarters are located in TBD.

Rivalry
Atletico Marte's chief rivalry is with the San Salvador-based team Alianza F.C., against whom they contest the Derbi capitalino. The two teams met 196 times since 1959, with the Alianza winning 87 matches, Atletico Marte winning 49 games and 60 draws. 
The most recent result was a 1-1 darw on the 16 February 2023.

Sponsorship
Companies that Atletico Marte currently has sponsorship deals with for 2023–2024 includes:
 Tony Sports – Official Kit Suppliers
 Chilo Seafood Restaurant – Minor sponsors
 Claros Vasquez Oficinas - Official sponsors
 Water Depot – Official sponsors
 Lacteos Villatoro – Official sponsors
 La Parilla Oriental – Official sponsors
 Sevisalnbsp;– Official sponsors
 GrupFe – Official sponsor

Current squad
As of 5 February 2023

Players with dual citizenship
   Sergio Escudero

Out on loan

In

Out

Coaching staff

Management

Notable players

Foreign players
Players with senior international caps:

 Jose Moris
 José Luis Soto
 Óscar Mejía
 Luis Tatuaca 
 Rafael Fabricio Pérez
 Manuel Camacho
 Luis Ernesto Tapia
 Jorge Lino Romero
 Agustín Castillo
 Fidel Suárez
 Abdul Thompson Conteh
 Alejandro Larrea
 Raúl Esnal

World cup players
This list all the players that have represented their respective national teams at the World cup. Those in Bold were playing with Atletico Marte when they played : 

 Raúl Magaña
 Roberto Rivas
 Santiago Méndez
 Salvador Cabezas
 Guillermo Castro
 Sergio Méndez
 Luis Guevara Mora
 Ramón Fagoaga
 Silvio Aquino
 José Luis Rugamas
 Norberto Huezo
 Guillermo Ragazzone
 Manuel Camacho

Copa America winners

 Raúl Esnal – Copa América 1983

Amílcar Cabral Cup winners

 Abdul Thompson Conteh – Amílcar Cabral Cup (1993 Amílcar Cabral Cup) & (1995 Amílcar Cabral Cup)

Team captains

Club records

 Longest unbeaten run: 20 matches (1985 season)
 First and only Salvadoran team to win the CONCACAF Cup Winners Cup (1991)
 First coach of El Salvador that won three championships consecutively: Salvadoran Conrado Miranda with Atletico Marte in 1955–57.
 First Salvadoran team to win in Costa Rican: defeating Deportivo Saprissa 2-0, 1952.
 Last Salvadoran team to win a CONCACAF Competition: 1991 CONCACAF Cup Winners Cup

Head coaches of Atlético Marte

The club's current manager is Argentinian Osvaldo Escudero. 12] There have been TBD permanent and TBD caretaker managers of Atletico Marte since the appointment of the club's first professional manager, Emilio Guardado in 1950. The club's longest-serving manager, in terms of both length of tenure and number of games overseen, is TBD, who managed the club between 1996 and 2018. Argentine José Santacomba was Atletico Marte's first manager from outside the El Salvador. Salvadorans Conrado Miranda and Armando Contreras Palma is the club's most successful coach, having won three Primera División titles; followed closely by Chilean Hernán Carrasco Vivanco, who won two Primera División titles.

List of presidents
Atletico Marte have had numerous presidents over the course of their history, some of which have been the owners of the club, others have been Military rulers. Here is a complete list from when Jesús Rodolfo Rodríguez took over at the club in 1950, until the present day.

Notes

https://www.lacarnerds.com/

References

External links
  

Football clubs in El Salvador
Football clubs in San Salvador
Association football clubs established in 1950
1950 establishments in El Salvador
A